Edith Dimock (February 16, 1876 – October 28, 1955) was an American painter. Her work was exhibited at the 1913 Armory Show in New York. She married fellow artist, William Glackens, but continued to use her maiden name professionally after the marriage.

Personal life
Dimock was born in 1876 in Hartford, Connecticut. She was given the nickname of "Teed", and was the daughter of Ira Dimock, a silk merchant based in Connecticut, and older sister of Stanley, Harold Edwin and Florence Irene Dimock (1889–1962). Dimock developed an interest in art in her childhood and began her education in art in New York in her 20s against the wishes of her parents. On February 16, 1904 she married painter William Glackens in her family's Vanderbilt Hill mansion, originally built for Cornelius Vanderbilt.

As a wedding present, Robert Henri painted portraits of the bride and groom. Edith's portrait was started in 1902. In it, she was described as "still a demure socialite from Hartford" by author Bennard Perlman. Until they could find a larger place, they first lived in a one-room apartment in the Sherman Building in New York City. They then lived at 3 Washington Square North. Following the marriage, "she devoted her time and energies to her family." Their son Ira, born in 1907, was a writer who wrote two books about his father. In 1913 Dimock gave birth to their daughter, Lenna, an artist. Lenna and Edith were favored models for William Glackens. From 1911 to 1917, Dimock and her family spent the summers at Belport on Long Island, where her husband, William Glackens, painted beach scenes. Artists and good friends May Preston and James Moore Preston often spent the summers there and traveled with the Glackens to Europe.

Dimock was an honorary secretary of the National Union of Women's Suffrage Societies in 1911 and 1915. In 1913 she marched in the large suffrage parade in New York, along with a group of other artists.

Her husband died in 1938. Dimock died October 28, 1955 at her home in Hartford.

Career
She studied at the Art Students League between 1895 and 1899 with William Merritt Chase. Dimock described her classes at the Art Students League:

She then studied with Chase at the New York School of Art. She shared a studio in the Sherwood building, and artist's cooperative building on 57th Street in Manhattan, with May Preston and another artist. The three women held weekly open houses and became known as the lively "Sherwood Sisters". The women gathered with male artists from the Ashcan School, including William Glackens and James Moore Preston, at Mouquin's and Cafe Francis. Following her marriage in 1904, Dimock continued to sign her works using her maiden name.

In 1904 her works were shown at the American Water Color Society exhibition:

She made watercolor genre scenes "though charming, often displayed a caustic sense of humor."

She illustrated Grace Van Rensselaer Dwight's children's book of nine short stories, The yellow cat and her friends which was published in 1905 and Kate Forrest Oswell's Stories Grandmother Told, which was published in 1912.

Her works were shown in 1908 with seven other painters at the Macbeth Galleries at the Ashcan School. Dimock exhibited at the New York Armory Show of 1913, where she showed 8 works, Sweat Shop Girls in the Country, Mother and Daughter, and six paintings, all entitled Group.

In 1928 her watercolor Contemporary portraits were shown with Beaulah Stevenson's at the Whitney Studio Club and were then part of a traveling show to the Art Students League in New York, Fogg Museum of Art, Denver Art Museum, Minneapolis Institute of Arts, the California Palace of the Legion of Honor in San Francisco, and the Arts and Crafts Club in New Orleans. The Whitney Studio Club, led by women patrons, held a solo exhibition of Dimock's work.

See also
 List of artists in the Armory Show
 List of women artists in the Armory Show

References

American women painters
1876 births
1955 deaths
Artists from Hartford, Connecticut
Painters from Connecticut
20th-century American painters
20th-century American women artists
Art Students League of New York alumni